Ingmar Lazar (born June 22, 1993 in Saint-Cloud, is a French classical pianist.

Lazar started to play the piano when he was five. He made his debut at the age of six at the Salle Gaveau.

At the age of 10, he won the International EPTA Piano Competition in Namur, Belgium, and in 2008, the C.I.M. International Competition in Val d'Isère. He was awarded the Tabor Foundation Piano Award at the Verbier Festival, Switzerland in 2013, and became laureate of the Safran Foundation for Music in 2016.

He has been invited to give concerts all over Europe, in Asia and in the United States in prestigious halls such as the Great Hall of the Tchaikovsky Conservatory and the International Performing Arts Centre in Moscow, Charles Bronfman Auditorium in Tel Aviv, Concertgebouw in Amsterdam, Salle Cortot in Paris, Herkulessaal in Munich, International Mozarteum Foundation in Salzburg, Romanian Athenaeum, Slovenian Philharmonic Hall of Ljubljana, as well as in many festivals ( Festspiele Mecklenburg-Vorpommern, European Weeks Festival in Passau, Festival de La Roque-d'Anthéron, International Colmar Festival, International Dinard Music Festival, Festival Chopin in Paris, Festival Les Piano Folies in Le Touquet, Festival 1001 Notes in the Limousin, Summer Music Festival of the Château de Lourmarin, Estate Regina Music Festival in Montecatini Terme, Festival Pianomaster in Gravedona, Querceto International Piano Festival).

He has been performing with conductors Julien Chauvin, Anna Duczmal-Mróz, Constantin Adrian Grigore, Jean-Jacques Kantorow, Nicolas Krauze, Vladimir Spivakov, Peter Vizard, and with orchestras such as the National Philharmonic of Russia, the Moscow Virtuosi, the Orchestre Lamoureux, Le Concert de la Loge, the Toruń Symphony Orchestra, the Romanian Radio Chamber Orchestra, the Academic Symphony Orchestra of the Lviv Philharmonic, the Orchestra Sinfonica del Festival di Chioggia.

As a chamber musician, he shares the stage with Pierre Amoyal, Nicolas Dautricourt, Benjamin Herzl, Stanislas Kim, Danielle Laval, Jean-Claude Pennetier, François Salque, Christoph Seybold, Ekaterina Valiulina, as well as the Hermès Quartet and the Vision String Quartet.

Ingmar Lazar's concerts were broadcast on radio (France Musique, Radio Swiss Classic, Espace 2, BR-Klassik, Ö1, Radio România Muzical) and on television (Mezzo, TF1, M6). He recorded several CDs both as a soloist and in duo with violinist Alexandre Brussilovsky for the Suoni e Colori label. A recording including Schubert’s Wanderer Fantasie and Sonata in A Major D.959 was released in October 2017 on the Lyrinx label. A recording with works by Beethoven (Bagatelles op. 33, Sonatas op. 81a "Les Adieux" and op. 111) recorded live at the National Theatre in Marseille "La Criée" was released in February 2019 on the same label.

A former student of Valery Sigalevitch in Paris and of Alexis Golovin in Geneva, he continued his studies with Vladimir Krainev, Zvi Meniker and Bernd Goetzke at the Hochschule für Musik, Theater und Medien Hannover. Thereafter he attended the International Piano Academy Lake Como and the Conservatory of the Italian Switzerland (Lugano) as a Theo Lieven scholar, where he was studying with Dmitri Bashkirov, Malcolm Bilson, Fou Ts'ong, and Stanislav Ioudenitch. He completed his Master's degree with Pavel Gililov at the Mozarteum University of Salzburg. He is a scholarship holder of the International Academy of Music in Liechtenstein, and was also a member of the Philippe Jaroussky Music Academy.

Since 2016, Ingmar Lazar has been the founder and artistic director of the Festival du Bruit qui Pense, which is  located in Louveciennes in the Yvelines, in north-central France.

Sources
http://musiktage-seefeld.at/programm_kuenstler_ingmar-lazar.php 
http://www.ingmarlazar.com/

Specific

External links
 Website of Ingmar Lazar
  Ingmar Lazar's blog
 YouTube Videos

1993 births
Living people
People from Saint-Cloud
21st-century French male classical pianists
Hochschule für Musik, Theater und Medien Hannover alumni